Wagle Ki Duniya is an Indian sitcom that aired on DD National from 1988 to 1990. It was produced by Durga Khote, directed by Kundan Shah, and was based on characters created by noted cartoonist, R. K. Laxman, especially "the common man" about the issues of common middle-class Indian man. It starred Anjan Srivastav as a bumbling sales clerk in a multinational and Bharati Achrekar as his wife.

Overview
The series was set around everyday struggles, of nervous sales clerk, Srinivas Wagle, who lived with prudence of a middle class person of the time.

Cast
 Anjan Srivastav as Srinivas Wagle
 Bharati Achrekar as Radhika Wagle
 Dushyant Nagpal as Rajesh Wagle aka Raju
 Harish Magon as Bhalla
 Virendra Saxena as Gadkari
 Narendra Gupta as Policeman
 Shah Rukh Khan
 Arpit Singhai as Priyanka Singhai Husband
 Deepak Qazir Kejriwal as Verma, Licence officer
 Achyut Potdar as Licence officer
 Harish Patel
 Mushtaq Khan
 Nandita Thakur
 Sankalp Dubey

Production
The weekly series was conceived by R.K. Laxman, and he himself narrated the script, It was based on RK Laxman character about quintessential common man.

The original run was supposed to be of six episodes, but seeing the response, it ran up to 13 episodes. The series achieved a cult status, and made Anjan Srivastav a household name.  Film actor, Shahrukh Khan made a guest appearance in the series before he  did Fauji (1988).

Sequel
A sequel series Wagle Ki Nayi Duniya aired on Star Plus in 1999.

In 2012, the character Wagle was brought back with new series by same team, Detective Wagle  on DD National in November 2012, where Anjan Srivastav reprised his role as Wagle, while the role of his wife was played by Sulbha Arya.

Wagle Ki Duniya – Nayi Peedhi Naye Kissey, a sequel series started airing on Sony SAB from 8 February 2021.

See also
 List of programs broadcast by DD National
 List of programs broadcast by Sony SAB

References

External links
 

Indian television sitcoms
DD National original programming
1988 Indian television series debuts
1990 Indian television series endings
1980s Indian television series